Baldwin Lake is located in Waterford Township, Michigan. The 9-acre lake lies north and west of Cooley Lake Road and east of Lochaven Road. 
At its deepest point, the spring-fed lake is 10 feet deep.

References

Lakes of Oakland County, Michigan
Lakes of Waterford Township, Michigan